One Way is the fourth studio album by American recording artist Tamela Mann, released on Mann's own independent record label Tillymann Music Group on September 16, 2016. One Way debuted at number 45 on the US Billboard 200 and topped the Top Gospel Albums chart, becoming Mann's second leader on the latter, where it led for 20 weeks.  The album was supported by two successful singles, "God Provides" and "Change Me", which peaked at #1 and #2 respectively on the Billboard Hot Gospel Songs chart.

Track listing
Credits adapted from AllMusic.

Personnel
Credits adapted from AllMusic.

 Faith Anderson – Vocals (Background)
 Lloyd Barry – Horn Arrangements
 Michael Beral	– Keyboards
 Michael Bethany – Vocals (Background)
 La'Tonja Blair – Vocals (Background)
 Erech Brookins – Bass
 Anthony "AJ" Brown Jr. – Bass
 Daniel Bryant	– Composer, Drums, Keyboards, Programming
 Myron Butler – Producer, Composer, Engineer, Keyboards, Producer, String Programming, Vocal Arrangement, Vocal Producer, Vocals (Background)	
 Joi Campbell – Vocals (Background)
 Manny Carter – Drums
 Chadney Christle – Vocal Producer
 Thomas Clay – Composer
 Monica Coates – Production Coordination
 Steven J. Collins – Keyboards, Talk Box
 Deonis "Pumah" Cook – Vocals (Background)
 Jaramye Daniels – Composer
 Eric Dawkins – Arranger, Composer, Engineer, Producer, Vocal Arrangement, Vocals (Background)
 Cleon Edwards – Drums
 Damon Farmer – Bass
 Jerrid Fletcher – Production Assistant
 Kirk Franklin – Composer, Producer
 Darrell Freeman – Bass, Composer
 Chris Godbey – Engineer, Mixing
 Richard "Rico" Gonzales – Engineer, String Programming
 Travis Green – Composer
 Matthew Herman – Composer
 Angel Higgs – Composer
 John Jaszcz – Mixing
 Kari Jobe – Composer
 KC Knight – Producer
 Braylon Lacy – Bass
 Phillip Lassiter – Horn Arrangements
 Mark Lettieri – Guitar, Lead
 King Logan – Engineer, Producer
 Tamela Mann – Composer, Executive Producer, Primary Artist, Producer, Vocals, Vocals (Background)
 Tia Mann – Featured Artist, Vocals, Vocals (Background)
 David Mann, Jr. – A&R, Executive Producer
 David Mann, Sr. – A&R, Executive Producer, Producer
 Shaun Martin – Bass, Keyboards, Producer, Programming
 Caleb McCampbell – Keyboards
 Melodie Davis – Vocals (Background)
 Rodney Middleton – Drums
 Frank Moka – Cajon
 Nicole Neely – Strings
 Todd Parsnow – Guitar
 Darius Paulk – Composer
 Daniel Pena – Drums
 Chris Peyton – Guitar
 Herb Powers – Mastering
 Matt Ramsey – Bass
 Derrick "Swol" Ray – Bass
 Bruce Robinson – Composer, Lead
 Cederias Robinson – Organ
 Michael Robinson – Keyboards, Organ
 Calvin Rogers – Drums
 Leo Saenz – Arranger
 Dominick Sanchez – Lead
 Robert Seawright – Drums
 Solomon Smalls – Keyboards
 Max Stark – Programming, String Arrangements, Strings
 Lakea Stokes – Vocals (Background)
 Jeff Taylor – String Programming
 Keith Taylor – Bass
 Timbaland – Featured Artist, Producer
 Brandon Tolliver – Drums
 Taylor Walton – Vocals (Background)
 Rick Watford – Lead
 Kermit Wells – Hammond B3, Keyboards, Organ
 Caltomeesh West – Vocals (Background)
 Chelsea West – Vocals (Background)
 Patrick Wright – Keyboards
 Y'anna Crawley – Composer
 Dariyan Yancey-Mackey – Vocals (Background)

Charts

Weekly charts

Year-end charts

References 

2016 albums
Tamela Mann albums